The Kroger Hills Camp for Anemic Children was established and run by the Cincinnati Anti-Tuberculosis League to promote health for children who lived in poor areas of Cincinnati, and had been exposed to tuberculosis but did not have the disease.  The camp was run during the summer months in the years 1914-1942, and was known as "Bamford Hills Camp" from 1914 to 1917.  In 1918, it was renamed "Kroger Hills Camp" (See "Kroger Hills Camp and Health Farm #2 Information Links" below).  The camp program included daily exercise, a healthy diet, sun baths for Vitamin D, and other healthful lessons/activities.  The intent was to teach the children a healthy lifestyle, and that they would hopefully continue their lives with these habits.

Among many other activities, grocer Bernard Kroger was a major fund raiser for the Cincinnati Anti-Tuberculosis League, and he helped fund the camp. The camp was located on a 92 acre tract along US 50 (Wooster Pike) between Mariemont and Terrace Park in the Cincinnati area.  In 1916 Kroger offered to spearhead fundraising to double the capacity of the camp. In 1922 the camp treated nearly 500 children who spent from one to ten weeks there during the summer.

In 1929, a similar camp for "Negro children" was opened near Amelia, Ohio on a 65 acre tract, and was called Kroger Health Farm #2.  Both camps operated every summer until ceasing operation after the camping sessions in 1942.  The Kroger Hills Camp site along US 50 was not maintained for any use, and as of 2022, the site is overgrown woods, with various concrete foundation remnants in place, including the two swimming pools that are located very close to US 50.  Health Farm #2 was sold in 1945 by the Anti-Tuberculosis League to the Churches of Christ of Clermont County (Oh), and is run today as the Woodland Lakes Christian Camp & Retreat Center.  Here is Woodland Lakes description of their history:
Woodland Lakes Tradition

Kroger Hills Camp and Health Farm #2 Information Links:
7/10/1914 Cincinnati Enquirer article mentioning new Bamford Hills Camp "...near Stop 8 on the C. M. and L..."   The CM&L was an Inter Urban Railway.
Description of the Inter Urban Railway (CM&L) that ran alongside Wooster Pike and served Kroger Hills Camp
8/12/1914 Cincinnati Enquirer article stating that the camp was on Wooster Pike (US 50) on land donated by B. H. Kroger
9/1/1918 Cincinnati Enquirer article indicating name change from Bamford Hills Camp to Kroger Hills Camp
6/12/1929 Cincinnati Post article announcing the opening of Health Farm #2
7/20/1930 Cincinnati Enquirer article describing the 2 camps
6/24/1933 Cincinnati Post article giving information regarding Kroger Hills Camp
1/20/1934 Cincinnati Enquirer item regarding Kroger, and the 2 camps
1939 US 50 Roadway Construction Plan Showing Location of Kroger Hills Camp Swimming Pools.  This improvement to US 50 pulled US 50 a little further away from the swimming pools.  In a map view, nearby "Wooster Lane" is a portion of old US 50 that was left in place by the 1939 US 50 project to serve the residences that existed and still exist along this stretch of US 50.  The entrance to the Kroger Hills Camp was at the eastern end of "Wooster Lane" upon completion of the 1939 US 50 upgrade project.
6/11/1930 Cincinnati Enquirer article showing kids in the small swimming pool at Kroger Hills Camp.  Wooster Pike visible in background
8/11/1942 Cincinnati Post article showing kids in the small swimming pool at Kroger Hills Camp.  The corner of the pool that is visible is the same corner of the pool seen in "November 2018 picture of small swimming pool" picture linked below
8/14/1942 Cincinnati Post article announcing abandonment of the camps
4/24/1945 Cincinnati Post article announcing sale of Health Farm #2
Kroger Hills Camp Large Swimming Pool, view from small swimming pool, picture taken in November 2018.  Aqua colored paint still visible.
Kroger Hills Camp small swimming pool, view towards US 50, picture taken in November 2018.  Aqua colored paint still visible.

References

Defunct summer camps
Summer camps in Ohio